Erling Lars Dale (12 March 1947 – 25 September 2011) was a Norwegian educationalist.

He took his doctor's degree in 1987, and was an associate professor at the University of Oslo. He was hired as professor in 1993.

Selected bibliography
This is a list of his most notable works:

Pedagogikk og samfunnsforandring (1972)
De strategiske pedagoger: pedagogikkens vitenskapshistorie i Norge (1999)
Rom for alle - blikk for den enkelte (2004)
Vurdering og læring i en elevaktiv skole (2006)

References

1947 births
2011 deaths
Norwegian educationalists
Academic staff of the University of Oslo